The Hipódromo de Asunción (sometimes known as Hipódromo de Tembetary or most commonly Jockey Club) is an 80,000-seat horse racing track located in the neighborhood of the same name in Asunción, Paraguay. It is owned by the Jockey Club del Paraguay. It was inaugurated on 18 September 1954 and is the largest in the country.

The grass track is 1,810 m long and 20 m wide, allowing for 450-metre races without turn.

Concerts 

In recent years it became a popular concert venue. Among the first events was Pilsen Rock, a rock festival with national and international artists. Due to its high capacity, the place is a good scenario for performers visiting this city.
Below is a partial list of international artists who performed at the Jockey Club.

References

Horse racing venues in Paraguay
Sports venues in Asunción
Sports venues completed in 1954